Childswickham is a village in Worcestershire, England, situated within the flat open
landscape of the Vale of Evesham, between the Bredon and Cotswold Hills, two miles from Broadway. It is an area predominantly of market gardening, arable and pasture land, with surrounding fields defined by hedgerows.

Being on the edge of the North Cotswolds it has a mixture of building styles, from Cotswold limestone to red brick, to the more traditional Worcestershire black and white half timber and thatch. The earliest buildings are timber framed with wattle and daub and Cotswold limestone.

The name Childswickham is believed to have derived from 'Child', the young son of a nobleman, 'wick', a clearing in the wood and 'ham', short for hamlet.

Its history can be traced back to Roman times as coins and pottery of this era were found in fields on the old Roman road from Worcester to London which came through the village.

The 15th century spire of the original Norman church, St Mary the Virgin, is a local landmark and can be seen for several miles.

Childswickham was a part of Gloucestershire until 1931.

References

External links
North Cotswolds Village News

Villages in Worcestershire